Velikoye is a rural locality (a village) in Domshinskoye Rural Settlement, Sheksninsky District, Vologda Oblast, Russia. The population was 17 as of 2002.

Geography 
Velikoye is located 40 km southeast of Sheksna (the district's administrative centre) by road. Katayevo is the nearest rural locality.

References 

Rural localities in Sheksninsky District